Manuel Raimundo Querino (July 28, 1851 - February 14, 1923) was a prominent Afro-Brazilian artist and intellectual. Querino's pioneering ethnographic works focused on the contributions of Africans to Brazilian history and culture.  Assessing his contributions, the historian E. Bradford Burns says, "Querino was the first black to write Brazilian history, a task to which he brought a much-needed perspective."

Early life 
Querino was born in Santo Amaro, Bahia in 1851. In 1855, both of his parents died during the cholera epidemic.  Left an orphan at the age of four, he was sent to Salvador to be raised by a guardian, Manuel Correia Garcia, a journalist and professor at the Normal School, who would later found the Instituto Histórico da Bahia in 1856.

At age seventeen, Querino travelled to Pernambuco and later Piauí.  There he was recruited (possibly by force) into the Brazilian army. Instead of being sent to the front, when it was discovered that he could read and write and had excellent handwriting, Querino served as a clerk at his battalion's Rio de Janeiro headquarters during the Paraguayan War.

After the end of the Paraguayan War in March 1870, Querino returned to Salvador, Bahia.  He dedicated himself to drawing and painting, which he studied at Salvador's Liceu de Artes e Ofícios as well as at the Academia de Belas Artes. Querino graduated in geometric design and taught at the Liceu and at the Colégio de Órfãos de São Joaquim. He produced two textbooks on geometric design.

Manuel Querino was active in politics as a labor leader, city councillor and abolitionist, publishing articles favoring the abolition of slavery and joining the Bahian Abolition Society.

He later co-founded the Partido Operário (Workers' Party) and the Liga Operária Baiana (Bahian Workers' League).

Querino was a founder and charter member of the Bahian Geographical and Historical Institute (Instituto Geográfico e Histórico da Bahia) in 1894. According to Burns, his research brought some consideration of Afro-Brazilian perspectives and sources to Brazilian history.  Querino completed oral history interviews to gather information from black Bahians.  He also used his contacts with Salvador's white elite to advocate for practitioners of Afro-Brazilian religions like Candomblé.

Querino engaged in intellectual debates against the racist and elitist science of his time, spearheaded by pathologist Raimundo Nina Rodrigues.

He was also the first scholar to publish biographies of Bahian artists - considered the Brazilian Vasari - and pioneered food studies by producing a book on Bahian cuisine that was published after his death by his son, Paulo Querino.

In popular culture 
The famous Bahian writer Jorge Amado drew on his story as an inspiration for creating his character Pedro Archanjo, the central figure of his 1969 novel Tenda dos Milagres (Tent of Miracles).

Quotations from his works

"Bahia reaches superiority, excellence, and primacy in the culinary art of the country as the African element, with its exquisite seasoning of exotic fertilizers, altered profoundly the Portuguese delicacies, which resulted in a completely national product, tasty, pleasant to the palate yet demanding, which surpases the righteous fame of Bahian cuisine." (QUERINO, 1922, p. 23)

"Brazil owns two real treasures: the fertility of its soil and the abilities of its mulattos." (Querino 1918: The black settler as a factor of Brazil's civilization)

Works
Desenho linear das classes elementares (Linear drawing of the elementary classes), 1903
Elementos de desenho geometrico (Elements of geometric drawing), 1911
Artistas baianos (Bahian artists), Rio de Janeiro, 1909
As artes na Bahia (The arts in Bahia), Salvador, 1909
Bailes pastoris (Pastoral dances), Salvador, 1914
A raça africana e seus costumes na Bahia (The African race and its customs in Bahia), In: Anais do Congresso Brasileiro V of Geography, Salvador, 1916
A Bahia de Outrora (Olden-day Bahia), Salvador 1916
O colono preto como fator da civilização brasileira (The black settler as a factor of Brazil's civilization), 1918
A arte culinária na Bahia (Culinary Arts in Bahia) 1928 - highlights the African contribution to Bahian cuisine

References

External links
 Manuel Raimundo Querino

1851 births
1923 deaths
Brazilian male writers
People from Bahia
Portuguese-language writers